Conjunto Chappottín, also known as Chappottín y sus Estrellas, is a Cuban son conjunto from Havana. It was founded in 1950 by trumpeter Félix Chappottín, pianist Lilí Martínez, singer Miguelito Cuní and other members of Arsenio Rodríguez's conjunto, which was partially disbanded after his departure to the USA. Currently, the group is directed by Jesús Ángel Chappottín Coto, the grandson of Félix Chappottín.

History
The founding of the band dates back to the 1940s. Its founder Arsenio Rodríguez was one of the country's most renowned band leaders with major influences on the Latin jazz and Salsa music of the next decades. With his Conjunto he was the first to add reed and brass instruments to a Latin band at that time. When Arsenio Rodríguez left Cuba in 1950 to undergo an ophthalmological intervention in New York to treat his eye disease, he handed the musical direction over to his first trumpet player, Félix Chappottín.

The band was renamed Félix Chappottín y su Conjunto Todos Estrellas. The band maintained a large repertoire of Arsenio Rodriguez, adding new pieces by Felix Chappottin and other artists. His son, Angel Chappottin Valdes, was also a trumpeter in the band. Felix Chappottín directed the band successfully until the year of his death in 1983.

From 1983 until the 1990s his son Angel Chappottín Valdes was musical director. Since then, the grandson of Felix Chappottín, Jesús Ángel Chappottín Coto, trumpeter, has directed the Conjunto Chappottín together Miguelito Cuni Jr., singer, percussionist and son of the former lead singer Miguelito Cuní. Angel Chappottín Valdes played congas with the group after his retirement.

In 2014, Conjunto Chappottín y Sus Estrellas made their first tour of the United States.

Style

The band dedicates to the traditional son with a variety of different stylistic elements such as son-montuno, guajira, guaracha, mambo, danzon, danzonette, charanga, afro-son, bembe, Cuban rumba (made up of yambú, columbia & guaguanco), and cha cha cha.

With the additional horn group Arsenio Rodríguez changed the traditional setting of a son band. Arsenio Rodríguez was one of the most influential Cuban musicians of the last century and had major influences of the development of Salsa and Latin jazz.

Under the direction of Felix Chappottín, the successor of Arsenio Rodríguez and musical director of the band for more than 3 decades, who was often compared with Louis Armstrong, the band gained international reputation.

Members

Founding members
 Felix Chappottín: trumpet, leader
 Lilí Martínez: piano, arrangements
 Miguelito Cuní: lead vocals
 Arturo "Alambre Dulce" Harvey: tres
 Sabino Peñalver: bass
 Félix "Chocolate" Alfonso: congas
 Antolín Suárez "Papa Kila": bongos
 Pepín Vaillant: trumpet
 Aquilino Valdés: trumpet 
 Cecilio Cerviz: trumpet
 Udalberto "Chicho" Fresneda: guitar, vocals 
 Carlos Ramírez: guitar, vocals
 Conrado Cepero: vocals
 René Álvarez: vocals

Current members
 Jesús Ángel Chappottín Coto: trumpet, musical director
 Miguel Arcángel Conill Hernández (Miguelito Cuní Jr.): singer and percussion
 Ángel Remigio Laborí Hernández: piano
 Francisco Vasallo Labrada: tumba
 Eduardo Antonio Canas Oliva: percussion
 Manuel Guará Colás: trumpet
 Gregorio Martínez Pedroso: trumpet
 Roberto Ortega Oviedo: trumpet
 José Lussón Bueno: singer
 Eduardo Font Paniagua: singer
 Eduardo Sandoval Nobregas: singer

Selected discography
1991: Conjunto Chappottin
1992: Estrellas de Cuba
1993: Chappottín y su Conjunto
1993: Sabor Tropical
1995: Canta Miguelito Cuni
1995: Chappotín y sus Estrellas
1995: Serie de Oro
1997: Que Se Funan
1999: Senores del Son
1999: Mi son mi son mi son
2000: Seguimos Aqui Chappottineando
2001: Mariquitas y Chicharrones
2001: Havana Social Club
2002: La Guarapachanga
2003: Son, Boleros y Montuno Con Sabor a Quimbombo
2003: Una Nueva Generacion
2006: Conjunto Chappottín y Sus Estrellas.
2007: Vuelven Los Senores Del Son

See also
 Estrellas de Chocolate

References

Publications
 Orovio, Helio (1992). "Diccionario de la Música Cubana". 2da. Edición. La Habana, Editorial Letras Cubanas.
 Orovio, Helio (2004). "Cuban Music from A to Z" Edition B&T, 
 García, David (2006). "Arsenio Rodríguez and the Transnational Flows of Latin Popular Music", Temple University Press

External links
 MySpace Seite

Cuban musical groups
Son conjuntos